Anna Christina Warg (23March 17035February 1769), better known as Cajsa (or Kajsa) Warg, was a Swedish cookbook author and one of the best-known cooks in Swedish history.

Early life 
Warg was born in Örebro, the younger of two daughters, to accountant Anders Warg (died 1708) and Karin Livijn (died 1755). In 1710, her mother married the nobleman Eric Rosenstråle, with whom she had seven more children and moved with to Borggård Manor outside Finspång.

Career
Warg left home early to be the cook and housekeeper for several powerful people in Stockholm, such as the general Count Wolter Reinhold von Stackelberg. It is not known when she started her career, but von Stackelberg had previously served with her father as an officer in the army, and it is considered likely that she was employed by him as his cook by the time he married and settled down in Stockholm in 1735. She was later employed by von Stackelberg's elder brother marshal Baron Berndt Otto von Stackelberg, and from the late 1740s, by the State Secretary and General Post Master Baron Leonard Klinckowström, whose wife Catharina Ehrenpreus was the cousin of her mother. von Stackelberg was the brother-in-law of Hedvig Taube, and Warg's abilities as a cook had good opportunity to become known in influential circles. He was described as a great gourmet and also hosted many receptions for Stockholm's cultural elite, who praised the cookery art there—one of them was Carl Michael Bellman, who wrote a poem about the food at the receptions, though he did not mention Warg by name. After the death of her last employer Klinckowström in 1759, she acquired his apartment, where she lived on her royalties and by renting out rooms. She died in Stockholm.

Cookbook 
In 1755, Warg inherited 5000 daler from her mother when she died. The same year, she published Hjelpreda I Hushållningen För Unga Fruentimber ("Guide to Housekeeping for Young Women") which was published in fourteen editions of which the last version was printed in 1822. It was also translated into German, which came out in four editions, and one Estonian edition. The book mostly contains food recipes but also includes instructions on dyeing textiles and other things related to household maintenance. From the third edition (1762), it included an appendix with the title Underrättelse om Färgning ("instruction on dyeing"). The appendix on dyeing was translated into Danish with two editions (1773 and 1794).

Warg's work was the leading cookbook for several generations and remained relevant until the late 19th century when new household goods, industrially manufactured kitchen stoves and changes in cuisine made most of its recipes outdated.

Editions
Swedish
first edition, 1755 (also published in a facsimile edition in 1970)
second edition, 1759
third edition, 1762 (expansion with an appendix on dyeing textiles)
fourth edition, 1765 (expansion with an appendix with more recipes)
fifth edition, 1770
sixth edition, 1773 (from this edition described as "å nyo öfwersedd, förbättrad och tilökt", "again reviewed, improved and expanded")
seventh edition, 1780
eighth edition, 1781
ninth edition, 1790
tenth edition, 1795
eleventh edition, 1800
twelfth edition, 1809
thirteenth edition, 1814
fourteenth edition, 1822

German
Schwedisches Koch- und Haushaltungs-Buch, first edition (1772)
second edition (1778)
third edition (1789)
fourth edition (1805)

Danish (only the appendix on textile dyeing)
Den paa Kundskab og Erfaring grundede nye Farve-Bog, first edition (1773)
second edition (1794)

Estonian
Köki ja Kokka Ramat, mis Rootsi Kelest Eesti-ma Kele üllespandud on (1781)

Legacy 
Tradition has attributed the saying man tager vad man haver ("you use whatever you have") to Warg, though there are no accounts of her having used that expression. Although these precise words have become strongly associated with her, the saying is not mentioned in her book.

See also
Anna Maria Rückerschöld
Hanna Winsnes, Norway's "Cajsa Warg"
Hannah Glasse, contemporary English cookbook author
Swedish cuisine
Early modern European cuisine

References
 Ärlemalm, Ingrid Cajsa Warg, Hiram och de andra: om svenska kokboksförfattarinnor. Ordalaget, Bromma. 2000. 
 Palmær, Margit, Cajsa Warg och hennes kokbok. Cajsa Wargs kokbok utgiven i urval med kulturhistorisk inledning. Stockholm. 1985.
 Du Rietz, Richard, Gastronomisk spegel: historisk översikt jämte förteckning över svenska kok- och hushållsböcker fram till 1850. Stockholm. 1953.
 Öjvind Swahn, Jan, Man tager vad man haver (1970)

Further reading 
 

1703 births
1769 deaths
18th-century Swedish women writers
Swedish chefs
Swedish food writers
18th-century Swedish writers
Women food writers
Women cookbook writers
Age of Liberty people